Lubzina  is a village in the administrative district of Gmina Ropczyce, within Ropczyce-Sędziszów County, Subcarpathian Voivodeship, in south-eastern Poland.

The village has a population of 1,800.

History
The local Catholic parish was founded in 1222 by Janusz Ligęza from the Ligęza noble family. In the late 19th century, the village had a population of 287.

During the German occupation of Poland (World War II), the local forest was the site of a massacre of 104 Poles, including resistance members, committed by the occupiers on June 27, 1940 as part of the AB-Aktion.

Transport
The Polish National road 94 runs through the village, and the A4 motorway (part of the European route E40) runs nearby, north of the village.

Sports
The local football club is Strażak Lubzina. It competes in the lower leagues.

References

Villages in Ropczyce-Sędziszów County
Nazi war crimes in Poland